The 2002 Heineken Open was a men's tennis tournament played on outdoor hard courts at the ASB Tennis Centre in Auckland in New Zealand and was part of the International Series of the 2002 ATP Tour. It was the 35th edition of the tournament and was held from 7 January through 13 January 2002. Sixth-seeded Greg Rusedski won the singles title.

Finals

Singles

 Greg Rusedski defeated  Jérôme Golmard 6–7(0–7), 6–4, 7–5
 It was Rusedski's 1st title of the year and the 14th of his career.

Doubles

 Jonas Björkman /  Todd Woodbridge defeated  Martín García /  Cyril Suk 7–6(7–5), 7–6(9–7)
 It was Björkman's 1st title of the year and the 30th of his career. It was Woodbridge's 1st title of the year and the 73rd of his career.

References

External links
 
 ATP – tournament profile
 ITF – tournament edition details
 Singles draw
 Doubles draw

 
Heineken Open
Heineken Open, 2002
ATP Auckland Open
January 2002 sports events in New Zealand